Lucien Weissenburger (2 May 1860 – 24 February 1929) was a French architect.

Weissenburger was born and died in Nancy.  He was one of the principal architects to work in the Art Nouveau style in Lorraine and was a member of the board of directors of the École de Nancy.

Some of Weissenburger's principal buildings include:
 Magasins Réunis (1890–1907; destroyed), Nancy
 Villa Jika, also known as the Villa Majorelle (1898–1902, in collaboration with Henri Sauvage), Nancy
 Imprimerie Royer (1899–1900), Nancy
 Maison Bergeret (1903-4), Nancy
 Villa Corbin (1904-9), Nancy (now the grounds of the Musée de l'École de Nancy)
 Immeuble Weissenburger (1904-6), Nancy
 Villa Henri-Emmanuel Lang (1906), Nancy
 Maison Chardot (1907), Nancy
 Theater of Lunéville (1908)
 Exposition Internationale de l'Est de la France (1909), Nancy:
 Maison des Magasins Réunis
 Pavillon du Gaz [Gas Pavilion]
 Brasserie Excelsior and Hotel Angleterre (1911), Nancy
 Magasins Vaxelaire, Pignot, and Cie (1913), Nancy

1860 births
1929 deaths
French people of German descent
Art Nouveau architects
Members of the École de Nancy
20th-century French architects